The Monumento al Sitio de Puebla is a monument in the city of Puebla's Zócalo, in the Mexican state of Puebla.

References

Historic centre of Puebla
Monuments and memorials in Puebla
Outdoor sculptures in Puebla (city)